Murugan or sometimes Murugadoss is a surname, commonly used among Tamil speaking people. Notable people with the surname include:
 Siva Murugadoss  (born 2001), neyveli,tamil nadu.
Who is son of A.Murugadoss. 
 Durai Murugan (born 1938), Indian politician
 Raju Murugan, Indian filmmaker
 AR Murugadoss indian flim maker
 Perumal Murugan (born 1966), Indian novelist
 Sangili Murugan (born 1945), Indian film actor
 Saravanan Murugan (born 1968), Malaysian politician